Northwest Christian School is a private Christian school in Phoenix, Arizona, United States.  The campus is located at 16401 North 43rd Avenue, northwest of downtown Phoenix. The mission of Northwest Christian School is to provide a Bible-based program of education that enables students to develop a Christian world view.  Northwest serves Pre-K through high school students.  The school's enrollment is 1,500.

Athletics

In 2015, they lost in the Arizona State High School Football Championship to Pusch Ridge Christian Academy Lions.

In 2021, Northwest's girls soccer team had an undefeated season.

References

Private high schools in Arizona
Private middle schools in Arizona
Private elementary schools in Arizona